Hello Moscow! is a 1945 Soviet musical film directed by Sergei Yutkevich. It was entered into the 1946 Cannes Film Festival.

Cast
 Oleg Bobrov as Oleg
 Sergei Filippov as Brikin, the accordionist
 Pavel Kadochnikov
 Nikolai Leonov as Kolya
 Ivan Lyubeznov as School Director
 Lev Pirogov as Grandfather Nicanor
 Vasili Seleznyov as Fedya
 Andrei Shirshov as School Assistant Director
 Anya Stravinskaya as Tanya
 Boris Tenin as Playwright

References

External links

1945 films
1945 musical films
1940s Russian-language films
Soviet black-and-white films
Films directed by Sergei Yutkevich
Soviet musical films